Fernando José de La Vieter Ribeiro Nobre (born 16 December 1951) is a Portuguese doctor who is the founder and president of the Portuguese NGO AMI (Global Humanitarian Action). In 2007 he was voted as the 25th greatest Portuguese ever in the contest Os Grandes Portugueses, being the 5th most voted among Portuguese living people at that date. He was a candidate to the 2011 Portuguese presidential election.

Early life
He was born in Luanda, Angola (it was then a Portuguese territory), in 1951. He moved to the Republic of the Congo (Léopoldville) by the age of 12. He spent 16 years in Africa. He studied medicine in Belgium, where he worked and lived for around 20 years.

He is married to Maria Luísa Ferreira da Silva Nemésio (born Coimbra, Santa Cruz, 21 February 1959), paternal granddaughter of Vitorino Nemésio, and has one son: Alexandre Focquet de La Vieter Nobre (born 2 June 1980) and three daughters: Isabel Focquet de La Vieter Nobre (born 11 May 1982), Leonor Nemésio de La Vieter Nobre (born 9 January 1993) and Gabriela Nemésio de La Vieter Nobre (born 7 November 1996).

AMI
He was part of Médecins Sans Frontières from 1977 to 1983. In December 1984 he founded in Portugal the NGO AMI — Assistência Médica Internacional. He has participated in humanitarian missions in over 180 countries.

Political career

Candidacy for President of the Republic
On February 19, 2010 he announced that he would be an independent (supported by no parties) presidential candidate to the 2011 Portuguese presidential election. Without any party support, he had a result of 14% of the votes, achieving 3rd place.

Candidacy for President of the Assembly of the Republic
After the election he declared that he was uninterested in partisan politics and refused the idea of turning his supporting movement into a party. He was deserted by some of his previous supporters after accepting an invite by the centre-right Social Democratic leader Pedro Passos Coelho to be the head of the Social Democratic lists and to run for MP for Lisbon for the elections which would happen in June 2011 after the fall of the Sócrates government. The fact that Nobre, considered a leftist and a Soarist socialist and who had supported the Left Bloc in 2009 (saying he "shared the values of the party"), was heading the electoral lists of a rightwing party. Other supporters were disappointed by the fact that he was involved in a party at all after what he had said about not involving in party politics. Nobre defended himself that he trusted Passos Coelho personally (stating he was an honest man) and that (quoting Gandhi) only who doesn't look for the truth never changes his mind. He also stated that he believed the left-right division was worn out, and remembered that he had supported other rightists like José Manuel Durão Barroso in 2003 and António Capucho for the City Hall of Cascais.

Nobre was elected, despite much discussion over his acceptance of the offer (including his statement that he was running just to be Speaker of the Portuguese Parliament and not an MP) with a quite positive result over Socialist competitor Eduardo Ferro Rodrigues.  Despite the apparent support of the Social Democratic seats in the Parliament, on 20 June 2011, in the first meeting of the Parliament elected by the 5 June election, Nobre failed to be elected Speaker even after two round of voting (gaining even fewer votes the second time around). It is argued that his defeat was not only due to opposition in the Social Democrats to having an independent as the highest standing among them in Parliament, to opposition of all parties to a non-partisan in Parliament. After failing to become Speaker of the Assembly, Nobre renounced his seat. He still attended to the parliamentary meeting of 21 June and had two justified absences (due to illness) on the meetings of 30 June and 1 July.

Since then, he has not had involvement in politics except for some political commentaries in television.

Electoral results

2011 Portuguese presidential election

|-
!  style="background:#e9e9e9; text-align:left;" colspan="2" rowspan="2"|Candidates
!  style="background:#e9e9e9; text-align:left;" rowspan="2"|Supporting parties
!  style="background:#e9e9e9; text-align:right;" colspan="2"|First round
|-
!  style="background:#e9e9e9; text-align:right;"|Votes
!  style="background:#e9e9e9; text-align:right;"|%
|-
|  style="background:#f90; width:9px; text-align:center;"|
|align=left|Aníbal Cavaco Silva
|align=left|Social Democratic Party, People's Party, Hope for Portugal Movement
| style="text-align:right;"|2,231,956
| style="text-align:right;"|52.95
|-
|  style="background:#f6f; width:8px; text-align:center;"|
|align=left|Manuel Alegre
|align=left|Socialist Party, Left Bloc, Democratic Party of the Atlantic, PCTP/MRPP
| style="text-align:right;"|831,838
| style="text-align:right;"|19.74
|-
|  style="background:gray; width:8px; text-align:center;"|
|align=left|Fernando Nobre
|align=left|Independent
| style="text-align:right;"|593,021
| style="text-align:right;"|14.07
|-
|  style="background:red; width:8px; text-align:center;"|
|align=left|Francisco Lopes
|align=left|Portuguese Communist Party, Ecologist Party "The Greens"
| style="text-align:right;"|301,017
| style="text-align:right;"|7.14
|-
|  style="background:#1f468b; width:8px; text-align:center;"|
|align=left|José Manuel Coelho
|align=left|New Democracy Party
| style="text-align:right;"|189,918
| style="text-align:right;"|4.51
|-
|  style="background:gray; width:8px; text-align:center;"|
|align=left|Defensor Moura
|align=left|Independent
| style="text-align:right;"|67,110
| style="text-align:right;"|1.59
|- style="background:#e9e9e9;"
| colspan="3"  style="text-align:left; "|Total valid
|  style="text-align:right; width:65px; "|4,214,860
|  style="text-align:right; width:40px; "|100.00
|- style="text-align:right;"
| colspan="3"|Blank ballots
|  style="width:65px; "|192,127
|  style="width:40px; "|4.28
|- style="text-align:right;"
| colspan="3"|Invalid ballots
|  style="width:65px; "|85,466
|  style="width:40px; "|1.90
|- style="background:#e9e9e9;"
| colspan="3"  style="text-align:left; "|Total (turnout 46.52%)
|  style="text-align:right; width:65px; "|4,492,453 
|  style="text-align:right; width:40px; "|
|-
| colspan="5" style="text-align:left;"|Source: Comissão Nacional de Eleições
|}

References
 Os Grandes Portugueses' Profile of Fernando Nobre

External links
 AMI official site
 Fernando Nobre's personal blog
 Presidenciais 2011 official site

Living people
Candidates for President of Portugal
1951 births
20th-century Portuguese physicians
21st-century Portuguese physicians